Business Finland is a public organization under the Finnish Ministry of Employment and the Economy. It was established on  1 January  2018, with the goal of attracting trade, tourism and foreign investment to Finland as well as providing funds for innovation. And as such, Business Finland is also involved in funding Finnish space researches, under the New Space Economy program, as well as startup companies, under Young Innovative Company funding program among other projects. The organization is made up of two entities: Innovaatiorahoituskeskus Business Finland (a government agency)  and Business Finland Oy (a government-owned corporation controlled by the agency).

History 
The predecessor of the agency was Tekes – the Finnish Funding Agency for Technology and Innovation (Finnish: Innovaatiorahoituskeskus Tekes), while the predecessor of the corporation was Finpro Oy. Tekes was founded in 1983 through the President of Finland, Mauno Koivisto, who ratified the Act on the founding of Tekes. "Tekes" is derived from Tekniikan edistämiskeskus (Center for Advancement of Technology), also translated as National Technology Agency or Technology Development Centre. The centre was founded primarily in response to an economic recession during the 1970s. At its formation in 1983, it employed twenty people. It began researching energy technology in 1995.

In 2009, Tekes invested €579 million in 2,177 projects, of which €343 million was directed to the enterprise projects and €236 million to universities, polytechnics and public research institutes.

In 2018, the Sipilä government fused together Tekes and Finpro Oy; a government-owned corporation for promotion of export. The target was to streamline business services and make sure that the service chain isn't broken when a company proceeds from R&D to export. The initiative also sought to gain business investors from abroad in addition to those at home as was evident from their webpage with the foremost goal being to "offer a smooth, joint service path for our customers in Finland and abroad when you need innovation funding, advise in growing internationally, investing in Finland or bringing visitors to Finland".

Organization 
There are currently 680 specialists working for Business Finland at 16 offices in Finland, and 42 abroad. Business Finland is a public-sector operator that is part of a larger network called Team Finland, which has a broader goal of bringing "together all public internationalization services". Business Finland also has a board of directors, which includes people familiar with the industry. The Board of Directors also includes a representative of the Ministry of Employment and the Economy. As of 2021, this position is occupied by the vice-chairman, Petri Peltonen who is also the Undersecretary of State for Ministry of Economic Affairs and Employment. The Board of Directors decides on the allocation of funding, while the executive director acts as the Board's representative. The composition of the Leadership Team and the board of directors is as follows.

The Leadership team 

 Nina Kopola – Director General
 Ari Grönroos – Executive Director, Funding Services and Support & Enablement
 Hannu Kemppainen – Executive Director, Strategic Performance Management
 Teija Lahti-Nuuttila – Executive Director, Network Services
 Satu Maaranen – Executive Director, Customer Management & Fast Growth
 Hanna-Mari Parkkinen – Executive Director, Offering Management, Marketing & Communications*
 Paavo Virkkunen – Executive Director, Finland Promotion Services
 Risto Vuohelainen – Executive Director, Global Growth
 Laura Ylä-Sulkava – Executive Director, Renewal & Human Resources

The Board of Directors 

 Chairman – Pertti Korhonen, Professional Board Member
 Vice-chairman – Petri Peltonen, Undersecretary of State, Ministry of Economic Affairs and Employment
 Juha Ala-Mursula – Director, Business Oulu
 Elina Björklund – CEO, Reima Oy
 Sami Lampinen – CEO, Inventure Oy
 Miia Porkkala – chairman of the Board, Aho Group Oy
 Nina Vaskunlahti – Under Secretary of State, Ministry for Foreign Affairs

Operations 
Business Finland functions as a funding agency for research and technology development. Receivers of the funding are universities, polytechnics, research institutes such as VTT Technical Research Centre of Finland, the European Space Agency, startups, small and medium-sized enterprises (SMEs), large corporations and public bodies. In enterprise projects, funding is given to transform research-stage ideas into viable businesses, and may combine direct unconditional funding with guaranteed loans conditional on the success of the resulting business.

At the Time of Merging
Finpro and Tekes united as Business Finland on January 1, 2018. The staff more or less retained their role with the newly formed organization expecting the restructuring only towards the end of the summer. Pekka Soini, the then-Director General of Tekes, became the director of the newly formed organization. The older services remained "remain intact" with newer one's on the way. Business Finland also launched the website at www.businessfinland.fi  on 8 January 2018 where future plans were outlined.

Business Finland remained at the same Tekes and Finpro addresses both internationally and in Finland. At Helsinki it was located at Team Finland House at Porkkalankatu 1.

Current Locations
The Agency is based in Helsinki. It is represented in fourteen regional Employment and Economic Development Centre (also known as the TE-keskus) throughout country. The agency also has offices in Beijing, Brussels, Tokyo, Silicon Valley, Hong Kong, and the District of Columbia.

See also 
 Academy of Finland
 Sitra
 VTT Technical Research Centre of Finland

References

External links 
 

Research institutes in Finland
Research and development organizations
1983 establishments in Finland